The 1993 SMU Mustangs football team represented Southern Methodist University (SMU) as a member of the Southwest Conference (SWC) during the 1993 NCAA Division I-A football season. Led by third-year head coach Tom Rossley, the Mustangs compiled an overall record of 2–7–2 with a mark of 1–5–1 in conference play, tying for seventh place in the SWC.

Schedule

Roster

References

SMU
SMU Mustangs football seasons
SMU Mustangs football